Events in the year 1929 in India.

Incumbents
 Emperor of India – George V
 Viceroy of India – The Lord Irwin

Events
 National income - 35,663 million
 6 January – Mother Teresa arrives in Kolkata to work amongst poor and sick
 29 December – All India Congress in Lahore demands independence
 The radical nationalists, led by Jawaharlal Nehru, push through the National Congress a resolution calling for virtual independence within a year.
 Bombay Flying Club is founded by JRD Tata.
8th April - Batukeshwar Dutt and Bhagat Singh throw bombs in the Assembly chamber, New Delhi.

Law

Births
8 January – Saeed Jaffrey, actor (died 2015).
20 March – Muhammad Hamza, Pakistani politician, (died 2021).
24 March – Ataullah Mengal, Pakistani politician, (died 2021).
29 March – Utpal Dutt, actor, director and writer (died 1993).
24 April – Dr. Rajkumar, actor and singer (died 2006).
1 May – S. G. Neginhal, conservationist, (died 2021).
1 June – Nargis, actress (died 1981).
4 June – Kapil Narayan Tiwari, activist and politician (died 2022).
10 June – Altaf Fatima, novelist. (died 2018)
15 June – Suraiya, actress and singer (died 2004).
14 July – V. C. Kulandaiswamy, academic and author (died 2016)
20 July – Hosbet Suresh, judge (died 2020)
25 July – Somnath Chatterjee, politician and Speaker of the 14th Lok Sabha (died 2018).
4 August – Kishore Kumar, playback singer, actor, lyricist, composer, producer, director, screenwriter and scriptwriter (died 1987).
6 September – Yash Johar, film producer (died 2004).
28 September – Lata Mangeshkar, "Bharatratna", internationally acclaimed playback singer, actor, lyricist, composer, producer. (died 2022)
29 September –  Syed Ali Shah Geelani, Pakistani separatist leader (died 2021)
30 September – Mir Hazar Khan Khoso, Pakistani judge and politician (died 2021)
2 November – Muhammad Rafiq Tarar, politician and jurist, 9th President of Pakistan (died 2022)
20 November – Milkha Singh, Olympic sprinter (died 2021)

Full date unknown
P. Lal, poet, essayist, translator, professor and publisher (died 2010).

Deaths
20 February - Rattanbai Jinnah, wife of Muhammad Ali Jinnah, founder of Pakistan

 
India
Years of the 20th century in India